St. Rose Priory is a house of the Dominican Order located near Springfield, Kentucky. It is the first foundation of that Order in the United States, and the first Catholic educational institution west of the Allegheny Mountains.

The St. Rose Roman Catholic Church Complex including the priory, the church, and a guesthouse was listed on the National Register of Historic Places in 1978.

The land for the priory was purchased by (then) Father Edward Dominic Fenwick, O.P. (later Bishop of Cincinnati) in July 1806 with money received from an inheritance.  He bought an existing farm west of Springfield, Kentucky.  Construction began shortly thereafter, including a church, priory, and college.  The college was begun in 1808 but the building was not finished until 1812.  It was named Saint Thomas' College, after St. Thomas Aquinas.  Its most famous student was Jefferson Davis, the future president of the Confederacy during the Civil War.

The church was named for St. Rose.  Though not designated a cathedral, the church served in the role of a cathedral until the Basilica of Saint Joseph Proto-Cathedral could be built in nearby Bardstown, Kentucky.  The church is in a stone Tudor-Gothic style architecture and includes an octagonal tower.  The Bardstown diocese was the first diocese west of the Allegheny mountains, with its first and only bishop, Benedict Joseph Flaget as spiritual leader of that diocese.  Though not the first Catholic church building in Kentucky (this honor belonged to St. Ann in nearby Springfield, a log cabin church) the church was the first brick church in Kentucky.  It is sometimes referred to as a "proto-priory".

A convent was added about 1822, an order of the Dominicans.  Later this convent moved to another location in Washington County, Kentucky and founded Saint Catharine College.

Although Saint Thomas Aquinas College closed in 1828, the priory continued, including an education role as a seminary, novitiate, elementary and higher educational levels.

The present church of St. Rose was erected in 1854.  Part of the original brick church of 1809 was preserved and is now the Eucharistic Chapel.  The brick was covered with a cement mixture to blend with the limestone of the newer church.

The original St. Rose church remains, though much of the old priory buildings (including the college and old novitiate) were torn down in 1978.  The grounds also include one of the original cemeteries in Washington County, Kentucky.  Some graves date to the early 19th century.

Notes

References
 Washington County, Kentucky, Bicentennial History, 1792-1992, published by Turner Publishing Company, copyright 1991 Library of Congress Catalog No 90-071724

External links
History of St. Rose Priory

1852 establishments in Kentucky
Dominican monasteries in the United States
National Register of Historic Places in Washington County, Kentucky
Roman Catholic Archdiocese of Louisville
Churches on the National Register of Historic Places in Kentucky
Roman Catholic churches in Springfield, Kentucky
Roman Catholic churches completed in 1852
Tudor Revival architecture in Kentucky
Gothic Revival church buildings in Kentucky